The 2019 Rugby X Tournament was held on 29 October, 2019 at The O2 Arena. The entire men and women's competitions were held the same day, as games only last ten minutes in total. Both tournaments featured national Rugby sevens teams from each that were represented. The men's tournament featured six teams between two groups. All teams qualified for the knock-out phase, as group play only positioned teams based on their final rank. The women's tournament only featured four teams; thus, the tournament only included a knock-out phase. This also included a third and fourth place game, which the men's tournament did not.

Men's group phase

Group A 
{| class="wikitable" style="text-align: center;"
|-
! style="width:200px;" | Team
! width="40" | Pld
! width="40" | W
! width="40" | D
! width="40" | L
! width="40" | PF
! width="40" | PA
|- bgcolor=#d0ffd0
| align=left |  || 2 || 2 || 0 || 0 || 55 || 30 
|- bgcolor=#d0ffd0
| align=left | Barbarian F.C. || 2 || 0 || 1 || 1 || 40 || 45
|- bgcolor=#d0ffd0
| align=left |  || 2 || 0 || 1  || 1 || 30 || 50 
|}

Group B 
{| class="wikitable" style="text-align: center;"
|-
! style="width:200px;" | Team
! width="40" | Pld
! width="40" | W
! width="40" | D
! width="40" | L
! width="40" | PF
! width="40" | PA
|- bgcolor=#d0ffd0
| align=left |  || 2 || 2 || 0 || 0 || 50 || 35 
|- bgcolor=#d0ffd0
| align=left |  || 2 || 1 || 0 || 1 || 60 || 45
|- bgcolor=#d0ffd0
| align=left |  || 2 || 0 || 0 || 2 || 35 || 65
|}

Men's knock-out phase

Women's tournament

References

2019 in Argentine rugby union
2019–20 in English rugby union
2019 rugby sevens competitions